Phenelzine, sold under the brand name Nardil, among others, is a non-selective and irreversible monoamine oxidase inhibitor (MAOI) of the hydrazine class which is primarily used as an antidepressant and anxiolytic. Along with tranylcypromine and isocarboxazid, phenelzine is one of the few non-selective and irreversible MAOIs still in widespread clinical use. It is typically available in 15 mg tablets and doses usually range from 45–90 mg per day.

Synthesis of phenelzine was first described by Emil Votoček and Otakar Leminger in 1932.

Indications
Phenelzine is primarily used in the treatment of major depressive disorder (MDD). Patients with depressive symptomology characterized as "atypical", "nonendogenous", and/or "neurotic" respond particularly well to phenelzine. The medication is also useful in patients who do not respond favorably to first and second-line treatments for depression, or are "treatment-resistant". In addition to being a recognized treatment for major depressive disorder, phenelzine is effective in treating dysthymia, bipolar depression (BD), panic disorder (PD), social anxiety disorder, bulimia, post-traumatic stress disorder (PTSD), and obsessive-compulsive disorder (OCD).

Pharmacology

Pharmacodynamics
Phenelzine is a non-selective and irreversible inhibitor of the enzyme monoamine oxidase (MAO). It inhibits both of the respective isoforms of MAO, MAO-A and MAO-B, and does so almost equally, with slight preference for the former. By inhibiting MAO, phenelzine prevents the breakdown of the monoamine neurotransmitters serotonin, melatonin, norepinephrine, epinephrine, and dopamine, as well as the trace amine neuromodulators such as phenethylamine, tyramine, octopamine, and tryptamine. This leads to an increase in the extracellular concentrations of these neurochemicals and therefore an alteration in neurochemistry and neurotransmission. This action is thought to be the primary mediator in phenelzine's therapeutic benefits.

Phenelzine and its metabolites also inhibit at least two other enzymes to a lesser extent, of which are alanine transaminase (ALA-T), and γ-aminobutyric acid transaminase (GABA-T), the latter of which is not caused by phenelzine itself, but by a phenelzine metabolite phenylethylidenehydrazine (PEH). By inhibiting ALA-T and GABA-T, phenelzine causes an increase in the alanine and GABA levels in the brain and body. GABA is the major inhibitory neurotransmitter in the mammalian central nervous system, and is very important for the normal suppression of anxiety, stress, and depression. Phenelzine's action in increasing GABA concentrations may significantly contribute to its antidepressant, and especially, anxiolytic/antipanic properties, the latter of which have been considered superior to those of other antidepressants. As for ALA-T inhibition, though the consequences of disabling this enzyme are currently not well understood, there is some evidence to suggest that it is this action of the hydrazines (including phenelzine) which may be responsible for the occasional incidence of hepatitis and liver failure.

Phenelzine has also been shown to metabolize to phenethylamine (PEA). PEA acts as a releasing agent of norepinephrine and dopamine, which occurs in a similar manner to amphetamine by being taken up into vesicles, displacing and causing the release of those monoamines (though with markedly different pharmacokinetics such as a far shorter duration of action). Although this is indeed the same mechanism to which some (but not all) of amphetamine's effects are attributable to, this is not all that uncommon a property among phenethylamines in general, many of which do not have psychoactive properties comparable to amphetamine. Amphetamine is different in that it binds with high affinity to the reuptake pumps of dopamine, norepinephrine, and serotonin, which phenethylamine and related molecules may as well to some extent, but with far less potency, such that it is basically insignificant in comparison. And, often being metabolized too quickly or not having the solubility to enable it to have a psychostimulant effect in humans. Claims that phenethylamine has comparable or roughly similar effects to psychostimulants such as amphetamine when administered are misconstrued. Phenethylamine does not have any obvious, easily discernible, reliably induced effects when administered to humans. Phenelzine's enhancement of PEA levels may contribute further to its overall antidepressant effects to some degree. In addition, phenethylamine is a substrate for MAO-B, and treatment with MAOIs that inhibit MAO-B such as phenelzine have been shown to consistently and significantly elevate its concentrations.

Like many other antidepressants, phenelzine usually requires several weeks of treatment to achieve full therapeutic effects. The reason for this delay is not fully understood, but it is believed to be due to many factors, including achieving steady-state levels of MAO inhibition and the resulting adaptations in mean neurotransmitter levels, the possibility of necessary desensitization of autoreceptors which normally inhibit the release of neurotransmitters like serotonin and dopamine, and also the upregulation of enzymes such as serotonin N-acetyltransferase. Typically, a therapeutic response to MAOIs is associated with an inhibition of at least 80-85% of monoamine oxidase activity.

Pharmacokinetics

Phenelzine is administered orally in the form of phenelzine sulfate and is rapidly absorbed from the gastrointestinal tract. Time to peak plasma concentration is 43 minutes and half-life is 11.6 hours. Unlike most other drugs, phenelzine irreversibly disables MAO, and as a result, it does not necessarily need to be present in the blood at all times for its effects to be sustained. Because of this, upon phenelzine treatment being ceased, its effects typically do not actually wear off until the body replenishes its enzyme stores, a process which can take as long as 2–3 weeks.

Phenelzine is metabolized primarily in the liver and its metabolites are excreted in the urine. Oxidation is the primary routine of metabolism, and the major metabolites are phenylacetic acid and parahydroxyphenylacetic acid, recovered as about 73% of the excreted dose of phenelzine in the urine over the course of 96 hours after single doses. Acetylation to N2-acetylphenelzine is a minor pathway. Phenelzine may also interact with cytochrome P450 enzymes, inactivating these enzymes through formation of a heme adduct. Two other minor metabolites of phenelzine, as mentioned above, include phenylethylidenehydrazine and phenethylamine.

Adverse effects
Common side effects of phenelzine may include dizziness, blurry vision, dry mouth, headache, lethargy, sedation, somnolence, insomnia, anorexia, weight gain or loss, nausea and vomiting, diarrhea, constipation, urinary retention, mydriasis, muscle tremors, hyperthermia, sweating, hypertension or hypotension, orthostatic hypotension, paresthesia, hepatitis, and sexual dysfunction (consisting of loss of libido and anorgasmia). Rare side effects usually only seen in susceptible individuals may include hypomania or mania, psychosis and acute liver failure, the last of which is usually only seen in people with pre-existing liver damage, old age, long-term effects of alcohol consumption, or viral infection.

Interactions 

The MAOIs have certain dietary restrictions and drug interactions. Hypertensive crisis may result from the overconsumption of tyramine-containing foods, although it is a rare occurrence. Patients on phenelzine and other MAOIs are strongly advised to avoid excess quantities of certain foods that contain tyramine such as aged cheeses and cured meats, among others. Serotonin syndrome may result from an interaction with certain drugs which increase serotonin activity such as selective serotonin reuptake inhibitors, serotonin releasing agents, and serotonin agonists.  

As is the case with other MAOIs, there is a concern regarding phenelzine and the use of both local and general anesthetics. Anyone taking phenelzine should inform their dentist before proceeding with dental surgery, and surgeon in any other contexts. 

Phenelzine has also been linked to vitamin B6 deficiency. Transaminases such as GABA-transaminase have been shown to be dependent upon vitamin B6 and may be involved in a potentially related process, since the phenelzine metabolite phenylethylidenehydrazine (PEH) is a GABA transaminase inhibitor. Both phenelzine and vitamin B6 are rendered inactive upon these reactions occurring. For this reason, it may be recommended to supplement with vitamin B6 while taking phenelzine.  The pyridoxine form of B6 is recommended for supplementation, since this form has been shown to reduce hydrazine toxicity from phenelzine and, in contrast, the pyridoxal form has been shown to increase the toxicity of hydrazines.

Research 

Phenelzine showed promise in a phase II clinical trial from March 2020 in treating prostate cancer.
 Phenelzine has also been shown to have neuroprotective effects in animal models.

See also 
Phenylethylidenehydrazine
 Hydrazine (antidepressant)
 Isocarboxazid
 Libby Zion Law (a case involving phenelzine and pethidine)
 Monoamine oxidase inhibitor
 Tranylcypromine

References

External links 
 

Monoamine oxidase inhibitors
GABA transaminase inhibitors
Hepatotoxins
Phenethylamines
Hydrazines
Withdrawn drugs